Bleeding usually means the leakage or loss of blood from the body.

Bleeding, bleed, or bleeder may also refer to:
Bleed (printing), intentionally printing across the expected trim line or edge of the sheet
Bleed, or spill (audio), when audio from one source is picked up by a microphone intended for a different source
Bleed, the presence of surface water on concrete
Bleed air, compressed air taken from gas turbine compressor stages
Bleeder, baseball term for a weakly hit ground ball that goes for a base hit
Bleeder resistor, which passively discharges a capacitor when it is disconnected or equipment is powered off
Bleeding (computer graphics), a computer graphics term for when a graphic object passes through another in an unwanted manner
Bleeding (roads), a type of pavement distress common in asphalt roads
Bleeding, or capillary action, the ability of a substance (such as blood, ink, or water) to flow in narrow spaces without the assistance of, and in opposition to external forces like gravity
Bleeding, purging air from a radiator, brake line, fuel line, etc.
Bleeding, the migration by dissolution of a component of a composite, e.g., pigments bleed into some plasticizers
Bleeding order, a relation between rules in linguistics
Bloodletting, a practice once believed to cure diseases

Arts, entertainment, and media

Film
Bleeder (film), a 1999 Danish crime film
Bleeders (film), a 1997 Canadian horror film
The Bleeder (in the UK and Ireland), Chuck (film), a 2016 American film
The Bleeding (film), a 2009 action-horror film

Music
Bleeders (band), a New Zealand band

Albums
Bleed (album), a 1999 album by Angel Dust
Bleed, 2011 album by Catalepsy
Bleeders (album), 2008
Bleeder (album), 2015
Bleeding (album), a 1996 album by Psychotic Waltz
The Bleeding (album), a 1994 album by Cannibal Corpse

Songs
"Bleed" (A Boogie wit da Hoodie song), 2020
"Bleed", song by Catatonia from the album The Sublime Magic of Catatonia (1995)
"Bleed" (Collective Soul song), 1995
"Bleed", song by Deadmau5 from the album While (1<2) (2014)
"Bleed" (Hot Chelle Rae song), 2010
"Bleed" (Soulfly song), 1998
"Bleed", song by Cold from the album 13 Ways to Bleed on Stage
"Bleed", song by Edge of Sanity from the album Until Eternity Ends
"Bleed", song by Meshuggah from the album obZen
"Bleed", song by Puddle of Mudd from the album The Punisher: The Album
"Bleed", song by Sentenced from the album Down
"Bleed", song by Vixen from the album Tangerine
"Bleeding" (song), a 2005 song by Lovex
"Bleeding", a 2005 single by The Prom Kings from their self-titled album
"The Bleeding" (song), a 2007 by Five Finger Death Punch

Other arts, entertainment, and media
Bleed (video game), an action-oriented platform video game
"Bleed", the emotional transfer between a player and their character during a role-playing game coined by Emily Care Boss

See also
Bloody (disambiguation)